The Inter-university Athletic League, often abbreviated LAI, is a college athletics conference in the U.S. Commonwealth of Puerto Rico.
The LAI is a non-profit organization whose main purpose is to regulate sports amongst its member institutions.  The league was founded in 1929 by Cosme Beitía of the University of Puerto Rico at Rio Piedras, Charles Leker for the Interamerican University of Puerto Rico, and Luis Izquierdo Galo y José D. Morales from the University of Puerto Rico at Mayagüez. The league is best known for its flagship inter-collegiate sports event locally called Las Justas which takes place yearly during the month of April, generally in the city of Ponce.

History
The League began celebrating three sports events amongst its member institutions in 1929; Baseball, Basketball, and Athletics.  Initially the League's events were open to male athletes only, but the practice was relaxed with time. Today male athletes compete in some 16 events and female athletes compete in thirteen.  Women began competing in the league starting in the 1969-1970 academic year.  Every year the league hosts the Justas de Atletismo y Festival Deportivo, their flagship sports competition event.  For many years the event was held in San Juan, but in 1993 the event was moved to the city of Ponce. In 2010 the event was held in Mayagüez in preparation for the 2010 Central American and Caribbean Games. Games resumed in Ponce in 2011, and continued in Ponce in 2012.

The league is administered by a "Administrative Council" made up of the Deans of Students, Athletic Directors, and a student representative.  There is also a "Cuerpo Rectoral" called the "Junta de Gobierno" made up of the Rectors and presidents of the member institutions.  The "Junta de Gobierno" chooses an employee called "The Commissioner" who is appointed to act as executive officer of the LAI for a period of two years. The League is a founding member of International University Sports Federation.

Sports 
 men's baseball
 men's & women's basketball
 men's & women's cross country
 men's & women's judo
 men's & women's taekwondo
 men's & women's soccer
 men's & women's softball
 men's & women's swimming
 men's & women's table tennis
 men's & women's tennis
 men's & women's track and field
 men's & women's volleyball
 men's water polo
 men's & women's weightlifting
 men's wrestling

Member schools

Current members 

Notes

Former members 

Notes

Notes

References

 
Sports governing bodies in Puerto Rico
Universities and colleges in Puerto Rico
College sports conferences in the United States
Sports organizations established in 1929
1929 establishments in Puerto Rico